Emese Szász-Kovács (born 7 September 1982) is a Hungarian left-handed épée fencer, three-time Olympian, and 2016 individual Olympic champion.

Career
Szász's first sport was swimming, but she grew tired of it. She did not think she would succeed in a ball game, being left-handed, so she took on fencing. Her first coaches were György Felletár and Béla Kopetka. She joined the junior national Hungarian team, with which she won a gold medal at the 1998 Junior World Championships in Valencia and a silver medal at the 1999 edition in Keszthely.

She began the 2013–14 season by winning gold in the 2013 World Combat Games in Saint-Petersburg, defeating in the final world champion Julia Beljajeva.

Medal Record

Olympic Games

World Championship

European Championship

Grand Prix

World Cup

Awards
 Hungarian Fencer of the Year (5): 2010, 2013, 2014, 2015, 2016
 Honorary Citizen of Zugló (2016)

Orders and special awards
   Order of Merit of Hungary – Officer's Cross (2016)

References

External links 

 
 
 
 

1982 births
Living people
Hungarian female épée fencers
Olympic fencers of Hungary
Olympic gold medalists for Hungary
Olympic medalists in fencing
Fencers at the 2008 Summer Olympics
Fencers at the 2012 Summer Olympics
Fencers at the 2016 Summer Olympics
Medalists at the 2016 Summer Olympics
Martial artists from Budapest